Jāti is the term traditionally used to describe a cohesive group of people in the Indian subcontinent, like a tribe, community, clan, sub-clan, or a  religious sect. Each Jāti typically has an association with an occupation, geography or tribe. Different intrareligious beliefs (e.g. Sri Vaishnavism or Smarthism or Shaivism) or linguistic groupings may also define some Jātis. The term is often translated approximately in English as caste.

A person's surname can reflect a community (Jāti) association: thus Gandhi = perfume seller, Dhobi =  washerman, Srivastava = military scribe, etc.

Meaning 
Professor Madhav Gadgil (1983) has described Jātis as self-governing, closed communities, based on his research in rural Maharashtra: 

Under the Jāti system, a person is born into a Jāti with ascribed social roles and endogamy, i.e. marriages take place only within that Jāti. The Jāti provides identity, security and status and has historically been open to change based on economic, social and political influences. In the course of Indian history, various economic, political and social factors have led to a continuous closing and churning in the prevailing social ranks which tended to become traditional, hereditary system of social structuring.

This system of thousands of exclusive, endogamous groups, is called Jāti. Though there were minor variations in its manifestation across the breadth of India, generally the Jāti was the effective community within which one married and spent most of one's social and cultural life. Often it was the community (Jāti) which provided support in difficult times, in old age and even in the resolution of disputes. It was thus the community which one also sought to promote.

With the passage of the Hindu Marriage Act of 1955, inter-jati and inter-varna marriages (which together constitute what is colloquially referred to as "intercaste marriage") are now legally sanctioned in Hindu-majority India. In practice, however, intercaste marriage remains rare and Indian society remains highly segregated along jati lines.

Overlap with varnas 
From 1901 onwards, for the purposes of the Decennial Census, the British classified all Jātis into one or the other of the varna social-status related categories as described in Brahmanical literature. Herbert Hope Risley, the Census Commissioner, noted that "The principle suggested as a basis was that of classification by social precedence as recognized by native public opinion at the present day, and manifesting itself in the facts that particular castes are supposed to be the modern representatives of one or other of the castes of the theoretical Indian system."

This deliberately ignored the fact that there are innumerable Jātis that straddled two or more Varnas, based on their occupations. As a community in south India commented, "We are soldiers and saddle makers too" – but it was the enumerators who decided their caste. Since pre-historic times, Indian society had a complex, inter-dependent, and cooperative political economy. One text, the Laws of Manu (c. 200 BC), conceptualized a system of idealized occupational categories (Varna), from the perspective of the Brahmin scholars. Although this scholarly work was unknown to the public during the Islamic period and even before, it gained prominence when the British administrators and Western scholars used it in the late 18th century, to gain an understanding of traditional Hindu law in India and translated it into English.

Crispin Bates noted in 1995 that

Self-identity narratives 
All Jātis across the spectrum, from the so-called upper castes to the lowest of castes and tribes, including the so-called Untouchables or avarnas, tended to avoid intermarriage, sharing of food and drinks, or even close social interaction with a Jāti other than their own. These Jātis did not see themselves as socially inferior to the others and many had their own jati puranas, or genealogies. If at all, it was the other way round and many had folk narratives, traditions, myths and legends to bolster their sense of identity, pride and cultural uniqueness, as the following examples illustrate.

For instance, the Yadavs, a prominent backward class today, believe that "Even in the Vedic age the Yadavs were upholders of the Republican ideals of government. ... The Mahabharata furnishes interesting details regarding the functioning of the republic form of government among the Yadavs. ... It is now an agreed fact that Sri Krishna, the central figure of the epic narratives, tried to defend the republican ideas against the imperialistic movement led by Jarasandha of Magadaha and Kamsa of Mathura" (R. V. K. Yadav, quoted by Lucia Michelutti in "Caste and modern politics in a north Indian town").

Dalits also have "the stories that assert the glory of the caste, identify legendary figures who, the narrators imagine, have played pivotal roles in building their caste identity. The facts of the past are interspersed with myth and fantasy to create a new perception of a past that is glorious, pure and exclusive. This in turn is accorded historical status and imagined to have existed from time immemorial (Seneviratne 1997: 5). This kind of history, which seeks authenticity from written sources and from the self-interpretation of so-called archaeological remains, is sustained by commemorations such as feasts, fasts, celebrations and the creation of new symbols like flags and emblems based on these ..."

See also
 Caste system in India
 Gens
 Gotra

References

Indian castes
Caste system in India

de:Kaste#Jati